Pinocarveol is an organic compound with the formula C10H16O. It is a bicyclic monoterpenoid, which is a combination of two isoprene units with one hydroxyl group as a substituent. It exists as either trans- or cis-pinocarveol, referring to stereochemical orientation of the oxygen as compared to the methylene bridge. It is a naturally occurring molecule in numerous plant species including Eucalyptus globulus and Picea abies. Pinocarveol is found in a variety of essential oils.

Synthesis 
Pinocarveol is formed by heating a mixture of turpentine, selenium dioxide, and hydrogen peroxide. The selenium dioxide acts as a catalyst while the hydrogen peroxide oxidizes the pinene found in turpentine. The other products in the turpentine are left unreacted.

Use
Pinocarveol is used as a food flavouring. In the European Union it is designated Fl 02.100.

References 

Monoterpenes
Bicyclic compounds
Alcohols